Aktaş is a village in Kumlu district of Hatay Province, Turkey. The village is at the west of Kumlu. The population was 1419   as of 2012.

References

Villages in Hatay Province
Kumlu District